Timothy James Bloodworth (1736August 24, 1814) was a slave owner, ardent patriot in the American Revolution, member of the Confederation Congress, vigorous anti-Federalist, U.S. congressman and senator, and collector of customs for the Port of Wilmington, North Carolina.

Early life and career
He was born 1736 in North Carolina to Timothy Bloodworth, Sr who had migrated to North Carolina from Virginia in the early 1700s. He spent most of his life before the American Revolutionary War as a teacher. He owned 9 slaves and had over 4,000 acres of land.

He had two brothers, James and Thomas, who were active local politicians. 
In 1776, he began making arms including muskets and bayonets for the Continental Army.  In 1778 and 1779, he served as a member of the North Carolina state legislature.  Following this, he held a number of political posts sequentially until serving as a delegate to the Continental Congress in 1786.  He served as an Anti-Federalist delegate from New Hannover County to the Fayetteville Convention on the U.S. Constitution in 1789.:

He was elected to the First United States Congress as a member of the House of Representatives, serving from 1790 to 1791 before returning to the North Carolina state legislature.  In 1794 Bloodworth was elected to the United States Senate, where he served from 1795 to 1801.  From then until 1807, Bloodworth served as collector of customs in Wilmington, North Carolina.

During the Second World War, liberty ship  was named in his honor.

See also
Benjamin Hawkins
Thomas Jefferson

References

External links 

North Carolina History Project

1736 births
1814 deaths
Continental Congressmen from North Carolina
Members of the North Carolina House of Representatives
Members of the United States House of Representatives from North Carolina
United States senators from North Carolina
State treasurers of North Carolina
Politicians from Wilmington, North Carolina
North Carolina Democratic-Republicans
Democratic-Republican Party United States senators
18th-century American politicians